Etched carnelian beads, or sometimes bleached carnelian beads, are a type of ancient decorative beads made from carnelian with an etched design in white, which were probably manufactured by the Indus Valley civilization during the 3rd millennium BCE. They were made according to a technique of alkaline-etching developed by the Harappans, and vast quantities of these beads were found in the archaeological sites of the Indus Valley civilization. They are considered as an important marker of ancient trade between the Indus Valley, Mesopotamia and even Ancient Egypt, as these precious and unique manufactured items circulated in great numbers between these geographical areas during the 3rd millennium BCE, and have been found in numerous tomb deposits.

Production technique

Etched carnelian beads with characteristic designs are widely known from various Indus Valley civilization sites dating to the 3rd millennium BCE, such as at Dholavira, and these beads "were exported to the Mesopotamian region during second half of 3rd millennium BC and were of extreme importance".

The technique used in making etched carnelian beads has been the object of ethnographical studies, particularly by H.C. Beck. It is rather complex and relies on delicate craftsmanship, etching chemical reactions and proper firing. First, the bead has to be shaped and polished from its raw state and pierced in its center, in order to form a regular bead of the desired shape. This process alone can take three to eight days of work. 

Then a chemical etching agent has to be formulated, which is typically a sticky paste formulated from an alkaline washing soda  solution (Sodium carbonate) and plant juice, most commonly Capparis aphylla, a bush growing in dry or arid areas in Africa, Iran, Pakistan and India. Once mixed, the texture of the paste also has to be just right to allow for a good spread without bleeding, thus permitting the creation of a beautiful design. The paste, once applied, is left to dry, at which point it only forms a transparent varnish.  

The bead with its design than has to be fired at the proper temperature, not too hot lest the beads fractures, but hot enough so as to permit  the chemical etching of the carnelian stone. The result design comes out beautifully white, usually with some surface calcinated residues which can be easily brushed away. 

In 1933, Ernest Mackay studied the process as still being implemented in Sindh, which was summarized by Gregory Possehl in the following terms:

Mesopotamia

Etched carnelian beads from the Indus were found in the tombs of the Royal Cemetery of Ur, dating to 2600–2450 BCE. They are an important marker of Indus–Mesopotamia relations in ancient times. The Neo-Sumerian ruler Gudea (circa 2100 BCE), in his Gudea cylinders (cylinder B XIV), mentioned his procurement of "blocks of lapis lazuli and bright carnelian from Meluhha." Meluhha is generally identified with the Indus region, and there are no known mentions of Meluhha after 1760 BCE. It is thought that these carnelian beads were considered as an important status symbol in Sumerian society.

Local Mesopotamian creations (Akkadian and Ur III periods, circa 2100 BCE)

Some of these beads of probable Indus provenance were engraved by Sumerian kings for dedication purposes. Shulgi in particular is known for having engraved two carnelian beads with dedication to his gods. 

One of them was found in Susa by Jacques de Morgan and is now in the Louvre Museum. Its inscription reads: "Ningal, his mother, Shulgi, god of his land, King of Ur, King of the four world quarters, for his life dedicated (this)" (Louvre Museum, Sb 6627). It is considered that this bead belongs to the smaller type of the "classically Harappean" beads, and was initially imported from the Indus Valley, and then engraved by Shulgi.

The other carnelian bead is in the British Museum, its inscription reads: "To Ninlil, his Lady, Shulgi, mighty man, king of Ur, king of the lands of Sumer and Akkad, dedicated (this bead) for his (own) life" (British Museum, BM 129493).

These two examples show that there was a level of Mesopotamian adaptation, and appropriation of the etching technology, in using or decorating carnelian beads, since there are no known beads with textual inscriptions among the carnelian beads excavated in the Indus region. In Mesopotamia, the tradition of inscribing beads of precious stones with religious dedications was an ancient one, as a lapis-lazuli bead belonging to king Mesannepada and dating to circa 2550 BCE is also known. Such dedication beads were created much later too, such as the  agate bead dedicated by Sargon II for Damkina in the 8th century BCE.

Some of the designs on the etched carnelian beads found in Mesopotamia are also typically Mesopotamian, and have no equivalent in the Indus region, such as stepped patterns, guilloché designs, or a Mesopotamian sun symbol in one case. This again suggests the existence of Mesopotamian workshops dedicated to the creation of some local designs of etched carnelian beads, the carnelian material itself most probably coming from the Indus region.

Egypt
A few etched carnelian beads have also been found in ancient Egypt, thought to have been imported from the Indus Valley Civilization through Mesopotamia, this time as part of Egypt-Mesopotamia relations. Examples are known dating to the late Middle Kingdom c.1800 BCE. London, Petrie Museum of Egyptian Archaeology, ref. UC30334.

Greece
Some rare examples of etched carnelian beads, have been found in archaeological excavations in ancient Greece, pointing to ancient trade relations with Mesopotamia and the Indus Valley civilization. One such object is visible in the Archaeological Museum of Aegina, the westernmost known occurrence of this type of objects.

Central South East and East Asia

China 
Etched Carnelian beads of Indus valley origin have been excavated from various archaeological sites in China dating from Western Zhou and Spring and Autumn period (early half of 1st millennium BCE) to Han and Jin dynasties. About 55 such specimens have been found, mostly from southern (Yunnan and Guangdong) and northwestern China (Xinjiang), in burial remains. They are red in colors, with white motifs, and were manufactured with drilling techniques only known in India. They are considered as imported goods, and indicate early cultural exchanges.

Tajikistan 
Etched carnelian beads have been found from female Saka burials dated 8th-6th century BCE in Pamir, Tajikistan, all likely imported from India.

South East Asia 
Etched carnelian beads have been noted at Thailand (4th century BCE-4th century AD), Vietnam (3rd-2nd century BCE, Sa Huynh, Oc Eo cultures), Philippines (manunggul cave, 9th-2nd century BCE), Indonesia, Malaysia (Kuala Selinsing, Perak, 200 BCE, possibly much older), Myanmar (site near Mandalay, 8th-5th century BCE).

See also
 Indus-Mesopotamia relations
 Egypt-Mesopotamia relations

External links

References

Jewellery
Beadwork